Hartland Township is a township in Kearny County, Kansas, USA.  As of the 2000 census, its population was 128.

Geography
Hartland Township covers an area of 149.73 square miles (387.81 square kilometers); of this, 0.04 square miles (0.1 square kilometers) or 0.03 percent is water. The stream of Sand Creek runs through this township.

Unincorporated towns
 Hartland
 Sutton
(This list is based on USGS data and may include former settlements.)

Adjacent townships
 West Hibbard Township (north)
 East Hibbard Township (northeast)
 Lakin Township (east)
 Southside Township (southeast)
 Kendall Township (south)
 Kendall Township, Hamilton County (west)

Cemeteries
The township contains one cemetery, Hartland.

Major highways
 U.S. Route 50

References
 U.S. Board on Geographic Names (GNIS)
 United States Census Bureau cartographic boundary files

External links
 US-Counties.com
 City-Data.com

Townships in Kearny County, Kansas
Townships in Kansas